G.729.1 is an 8-32 kbit/s embedded speech and audio codec providing bitstream interoperability with G.729, G.729 Annex A and G.729 Annex B. Its official name is G.729-based embedded variable bit rate codec: An 8-32 kbit/s scalable wideband coder bitstream interoperable with G.729. It was introduced in 2006.

This codec has been designed to provide better quality and more flexibility than the existing ITU-T G.729 speech coding standard.
G.729.1 is scalable in bit rate, acoustic bandwidth and complexity.
In addition it offers various encoder and decoder modes, including the support of both 8 and 16 kHz input/output sampling frequency, compatibility with G.729B, and reduced algorithmic delay.
The bitstream of G.729.1 is structured into 12 hierarchical layers.
The first layer (or core layer) at 8 kbit/s follows the G.729 format.
The second layer (adds 4 kbit/s for a total of 12 kbit/s) is a narrowband enhancement layer. The third layer (2 kbit/s for a total of 14 kbit/s) is a bandwidth extension layer. Further layers (in 2 kbit/s steps) are wideband enhancement layers.
The G.729.1 output bandwidth is 50–4000 Hz at 8 and
12 kbit/s, and 50–7000 Hz from 14 to 32 kbit/s. G.729.1 is also known as G.729 Annex J and G.729EV where EV stands for Embedded Variable (bit rate).

The G.729.1 algorithm is based on a three-stage coding structure: embedded code-excited linear prediction (CELP) coding of the lower band (50–4000 Hz), parametric coding of the higher band (4000–7000 Hz) by Time-Domain Bandwidth Extension (TDBWE), and enhancement of the full band (50–7000 Hz) by a predictive transform coding technique referred to as time-domain aliasing cancellation (TDAC) or modified discrete cosine transform (MDCT) coding.

As of January 1, 2017, the patent terms of most licensed patents under the G.729 Consortium have expired, the remaining unexpired patents are usable on a royalty-free basis.

See also
List of codecs
G.729

References

External links
 ITU-T Recommendation G.729.1 - technical specification
 Summary of G.729.1 (05/2006)
  - RTP Payload Format for the G.729.1 Audio Codec
  - G.729.1 RTP Payload Format Update: Discontinuous Transmission (DTX) Support

Audio codecs
Speech codecs
ITU-T recommendations
ITU-T G Series Recommendations